Federico del Bonis and Horacio Zeballos were the defending champions but del Bonis decided not to participate.
Zeballos played alongside Ariel Behar but lost in the first round.
Mateusz Kowalczyk and David Škoch defeated Denis Matsukevich and Mischa Zverev 6–2, 6–1 in the final to win the title.

Seeds

Draw

Draw

References
 Main Draw

Marburg Open - Doubles
2012 Doubles